Tula Cartridge Plant, also Tula Cartridge Works (TCW) (Tul'skiy Patronnyj Zavod) is a company based in Tula, Russia.

The Tula Cartridge Plant is a manufacturer of metal products, including ammunition for the military, and various civilian products.

It absorbed the Ulyanovsk Cartridge Plant in 2005.

External links
 Official website

Manufacturing companies of Russia
Companies based in Tula Oblast
Defence companies of the Soviet Union
Ministry of the Defense Industry (Soviet Union)